Oktoberfest is a 1987 Yugoslav drama film directed by Dragan Kresoja. It was entered into the 15th Moscow International Film Festival.

Cast
 Svetislav Goncić as Luka Banjanin
 Zoran Cvijanovic as Bane
 Zarko Lausevic as Skobi
 Vladislava Milosavljevic as Jasna
 Velimir 'Bata' Zivojinovic as Skoblar
 Zeljka Cvjetan as Svetlana
 Goran Radakovic as Dule
 Tatjana Pujin as Mala Irena
 Djurdjija Cvetic as Skoblarova zena (as Djurdjija Cvijetic)
 Ruzica Sokic as Luletova majka
 Petar Kralj as Luletov otac
 Bogdan Diklic as Vanja
 Vesna Trivalic as Buca
 Branislav Lecic as Lepi
 Srdjan Todorovic as Goran

See also
 Yugoslav films of the 1980s

References

External links
 

1987 films
1987 drama films
Serbian drama films
Serbo-Croatian-language films
Yugoslav drama films
Films set in Yugoslavia
Films set in Belgrade
Films shot in Belgrade